USS Monterey was a steamer purchased by the Union Navy during the American Civil War. She was used by the navy as a tugboat for several decades on the U.S. West Coast.

Monterey, a steam screw tug, was built as Monitor in 1862 by Eden Landing, San Francisco, California; purchased by the Navy from William Mighell 20 April 1863; renamed Monterey 18 May 1863: and placed in service the same day.

Assigned to the Mare Island Navy Yard 
 
The first tug permanently assigned to Mare Island Navy Yard, Monterey served the Navy at that base for nearly three decades, operating in and around Mare Island, California, and San Francisco Bay, towing ships and barges during the shipyard’s years of development into one of America’s largest shipbuilding centers.

Decommissioned and scrapped after three decades of work 

Her name was changed to Ivy 3 January 1891 and she was struck from the Naval Register 7 October 1892 and scrapped.

References  

 

Ships of the Union Navy
Steamships of the United States Navy
Tugs of the United States Navy
Ships built in San Francisco
1862 ships